Siah Darreh (also Romanized as Sīāh Darreh and Siyah Darreh) is a village in Naharjan Rural District, Mud District, Sarbisheh County, South Khorasan Province, Iran. At the 2006 census, its population was 57, in 22 families.

References 

Populated places in Sarbisheh County